Sergey Baranovsky (born 27 January 1968) is a Belarusian former professional footballer and Belarus international. He was a top scorer of Belarusian Premier League in 1992–93 season. He retired from playing career in 1995 (at the age of 27) due to injury. During 2000s he worked as an assistant referee at domestic football competitions.

Honours
Dinamo Minsk
Belarusian Premier League champion: 1992–93, 1993–94, 1994–95
Belarusian Cup winner: 1993–94

References

External links
 Profile at teams.by
 

1968 births
Living people
Belarusian footballers
FC Dinamo Minsk players
FC Molodechno players
Belarusian Premier League players
Belarus international footballers
Association football forwards